Sir William Fairfax (by 1531– 1 November 1597), of Gilling Castle and Walton, Yorkshire, was an English politician.

He was the eldest son of Sir Nicholas Fairfax of Gilling, who he succeeded in 1571. He was knighted in 1560 and was a Justice of the Peace for Yorkshire from 1562 until his death.

He was a Member (MP) of the Parliament of England for Boroughbridge in 1558 and for Yorkshire in 1597. He was High Sheriff of Yorkshire for 1577–78 and a member of the Council in the North from 1577 to his death.

He died in 1597 shortly after his election to Parliament. He had married twice; firstly Agnes, the daughter of George, Lord Darcy and secondly Jane, the daughter and heiress of Brian Stapleton of Burton Joyce, Nottinghamshire. He had one son, Thomas, who was made Viscount Fairfax in 1629.

References

1597 deaths
English MPs 1558
Members of the Parliament of England for constituencies in Yorkshire
People from Ryedale (district)
English knights
High Sheriffs of Yorkshire
Year of birth uncertain
English justices of the peace
English MPs 1597–1598